Matteo Trevisan (born 13 August 1989) is an Italian professional tennis player who was ranked world number one junior player in 2007. Alongside Daniel Alejandro Lopez, he won the Junior Wimbledon doubles title of that year.

Trevisan is the older brother of Martina Trevisan, who is also a tennis player.

ATP Challenger and ITF Futures finals

Singles: 13 (8–5)

Doubles: 12 (6–6)

Junior Grand Slam finals

Doubles: 1 (1 title)

References

External links
 
 

Italian male tennis players
Living people
1989 births
Wimbledon junior champions
Sportspeople from Florence
Grand Slam (tennis) champions in boys' doubles
21st-century Italian people